Governor Daniel may refer to:

Bill Daniel (1915–2006), 5th Appointed Governor of Guam
Price Daniel (1910–1988), 38th Governor of Texas

See also
Mitch Daniels (born 1949), 49th Governor of Indiana